Songwe District is a district established in 2015 in Songwe Region, Tanzania.

Wards 
There are 18 wards in the Songwe District.

 Chang'ombe (9,038)
 Galula (9,602)
 Gua (7,433)
 Ifwenkenya (8,961)
 Kanga (10,729)
 Kapalala  (3,298)
 Magamba (11,933)
 Manda (8,678)
 Mbangala (6,396)
 Mbuyuni (10,665)
 Mkwajuni ((17,398)
 Mpona (7,295)
 Mwambani (10,139)
 Namkukwe (7,617)
 Ngwala (3,432)
 Saza (7,632)
 Totowe (5,951)
 Udinde (5,905)

References 

Districts of Songwe Region